The following is a list of transfers for 2017 Malaysian football.

Malaysia Super League
The 2017 Malaysia Super League (also known as Liga Super Malaysia 2017) is the 14th season of the highest Malaysian football league since its inception in 2004. 12 teams participated in the league with Johor Darul Ta'zim as the defending champions.

The first transfer season start 31 October 2016 to 22 January 2017.

FELDA United
Head coach:  Azmi Mohamed (1st season)

 In: 

 Out:

Johor Darul Ta'zim 
Manager / head coach:  Benjamin Mora (1st season)

 In: 

 Out:

Kedah 
Head coach:  Tan Cheng Hoe (4th season)

 In: 

 Out:

Kelantan 
Head coach:  Zahasmi Ismail (1season)

 In: 

 Out:

Melaka United 
Head coach:  Eric Williams (1st season)

 In: 

 Out:

Pahang 
Head coach:  Dollah Salleh (1st season)

 In: 

 Out:

Penang 
Head coach:  Zainal Abidin Hassan(1st season)

 In: 

 Out:

Perak 
Head coach:  Mehmet Durakovic

 In: 

 Out:

PKNS 
Head coach:  E. Elavarasan (2nd season)

 In: 

 Out:

Sarawak 
Head coach:  David Usop (2nd season)

 In: 

 Out:

Selangor 
Head coach:  P. Maniam (1st season)

 In: 

 Out:

T–Team 
Head coach:  Rahmad Darmawan (2nd season)

 In: 

 Out:

Malaysia Premier League
The 2017 Malaysia Premier League is the 14th season of the Malaysia Premier League since its inception in 2004. 12 teams participated in the league with Melaka United as the reigning champions and currently play in the top flight of Malaysian football, Malaysia Super League. At the end of 2016 season, DRB-Hicom has pulled out from the league.

The season started on 20 January 2017.

ATM 
Head Coach: Azhar Abdullah

 In: 

 Out:

Johor Darul Ta'zim II 
Head Coach : Mohd Hamzani Omar

 In: 

 Out:

Kuala Lumpur 
Head coach : Fábio Joaquim Maciel da Silva

 In: 

 Out:

Kuantan 

 In: 

 Out:

MISC-MIFA 

 In: 

 Out:

Negeri Sembilan 

 In: 

 Out:

PDRM 

 In: 

 Out:

Perlis 

 In: 

 Out:

Sabah 

 In: 

 Out:

PKNP 

 In: 

 Out:

Terengganu 

 In: 

 Out:

UiTM

 In: 

 Out:

DRB-Hicom 

 Out:

Malaysia FAM League
The 2017 Malaysia FAM League (referred to as the FAM League) is the 64th season of the FAM League since its establishment in 1952. The league is currently the third level football league in Malaysia. MISC-MIFA are the defending champions and currently play in the second level of Malaysian football, Malaysia Premier League.

DBKL 

 In: 

 Out:

FELCRA 

 In: 

 Out:

Hanelang 

 In: 

 Out:

KDMM 

 In: 

 Out:

Kuching 

 In: 

 Out:

MPKB-BRI U-BeS 

 In: 

 Out:

MOF 

 In: 

 Out:

SAMB 

 In: 

 Out:

PBMS 

 In: 

 Out:

Penjara 

 In: 

 Out: 

|}

PJ Rangers 

 In: 

 Out:

Sime Darby 

 In: 

 Out:

Shahzan Muda 

 In: 

 Out:

Sungai Ara 

 In: 

 Out:

Terengganu City 

 In: 

 Out:

UKM 

 In: 

 Out:

See also

 2017 Malaysia Super League
 2017 Malaysia Premier League
 2017 Malaysia FAM League
 2017 Malaysia FA Cup
 2017 Malaysia Cup
 2017 Malaysia President's Cup
 2017 Malaysia Youth League
 Football Association of Malaysia
 Malaysian football league system

References

2017
Tranfers
Malaysia